John Henry Mary Wigman (August 15, 1835 – January 31, 1920) was mayor of Green Bay, Wisconsin.

Biography
Wigman was born on August 15, 1835, in Amsterdam, Netherlands. He moved to the United States with his brother when he was thirteen years old. They settled in Little Chute, Wisconsin, before moving to Bay Settlement, Wisconsin. Wigman married Matilda Lyannoise in 1856 and the couple moved to Appleton, Wisconsin. They would have seven children. After Matilda's passing, he married Jennie Meagher. Wigman moved to Green Bay in 1870. He died from diabetes mellitus on January 31, 1920.

Career
Wigman was a lawyer, practicing law in Appleton and Green Bay. He served as mayor in 1882. He was the United States Attorney for the Eastern District of Wisconsin from 1893-1897.

External links 
 Biography

References

Dutch emigrants to the United States
Politicians from Appleton, Wisconsin
Mayors of Green Bay, Wisconsin
Wisconsin lawyers
1835 births
1920 deaths
Deaths from diabetes
United States Attorneys for the Eastern District of Wisconsin
People from Little Chute, Wisconsin
19th-century American lawyers